Magdanly  (Turkmen Cyrillic: Магданлы; formerly known as Gowurdak or Gaurdak ), is a city in and seat of Magdanly District, Lebap Province, Turkmenistan.

Etymology
The word magdan means "ore" in Turkmen, and the suffix -ly means "with", hence "with ore". The area, in the foothills of the Köýtendag Mountains, is rich in various mineral ores. The former name, Gowurdak, referred to a mountain in that district which is mined for high-quality sulfur. Atanyyazow explains that the name Gowurdak "is derived from the local dialect gövür ('sulfur') and the word dag, yielding 'sulfur mountain'."

References

Populated places in Mary Region
Districts of Turkmenistan